The 1989 McNeese State Cowboys football team was an American football team that represented McNeese State University as a member of the Southland Conference (Southland) during the 1989 NCAA Division I-AA football season. In their third year under head coach Sonny Jackson, the team compiled an overall record of 5–6, with a mark of 2–4 in conference play, and finished tied for fifth in the Southland.

Schedule

References

McNeese State
McNeese Cowboys football seasons
McNeese State Cowboys football